The women's 4×6 kilometre relay at the 2007 Asian Winter Games was held on 2 February 2007 at Beida Lake Skiing Resort, China.

Schedule
All times are China Standard Time (UTC+08:00)

Results

References

Results

External links
Official website

Women relay